Oleksiy Volodymyroyvch Kuleba (Ukrainian: Олексій Володимирович Кулеба; b. 8 August 1983) is a Ukrainian politician. He served as Governor of Kyiv Oblast from 21 May 2022 until 24 January 2023. He has served as the Deputy Head of the Office of the President of Ukraine since January 24, 2023.

He was the deputy Governor of Kyiv Oblast from 16 March 2022 till 21 May 2022. Kuleba is a participant in hostilities to repel Russian aggression against Ukraine.

Kuleba served as the governor of Kyiv Oblast from 8 February 2022 till 15 March 2022, and served as Deputy Governor from 1 January 2021 to 7 February 2022.

He was the director of the Improvement Department of Kyiv City Council from 2019 to 2021, and was the deputy of the Rzhyshchiv City Council of Kyiv Oblast from 2010 to 2015.

Early life
Oleksiy Kuleba was born on 8 August 1983 in Kyiv in the family of journalist and writer Volodymyr Kuleba.

In 2005, he graduated from Kyiv National Economic University with a degree in International Economics and a master's degree in International Economics. He is a candidate of Sciences in Public Administration. He is a candidate of Sciences in Public Administration as of 2005. He is also a candidate for Master of Sports in Basketball.

Career
He is a manager of the municipal enterprise of Kyiv Regional Council "Kyiv-Media", in Kyiv.

From 2005 to 2008, he studied at the graduate school of the National Academy of Public Administration under the President of Ukraine. At the same time, he was an assistant to the People's Deputy of Ukraine.

From 2007 to 2010, he was the General Director of Khonin and Partners LLC.

In 2010, he was a Senior Lecturer of the Department of Self-Government PJSC "Higher Educational Institution" Interregional Academy of Personnel Management".

From 2010 to 2015, he was a Deputy of the Rzhyshchiv City Council of Kyiv Oblast.

In 2014, he was an assistant to the deputy of Kyiv City Council on a voluntary basis.

From 2016 to 2017, he was an advisor to the General Director of the municipal enterprise for protection, maintenance and operation of lands of the water fund of Kyiv "Pleso" of the executive body of Kyiv City Council, and within Kyiv City State Administration on a voluntary basis.

From 2018 to 2019, he serve as general director of Asper LLC, in Kyiv.

From 2019 to 2021, he was director of the department of improvement of Kyiv City Council.

From 2021 to 2022, he was first deputy chairman of Kyiv City state administration for the implementation of self-governing powers.

On 8 February 2022, Kuleba became the Governor of Kyiv Oblast.

On 15 March 2022, to further strengthen the defense of the capital and Kyiv Oblast, President of Ukraine Volodymyr Zelenskyy appointed Oleksandr Pavlyuk, a commander of the Joint Forces Operation, as the governor of Kyiv Oblast. Kuleba thus became the deputy governor again.

On 21 May 2022, he became Governor of Kyiv Oblast again. On 24 January 2023, he was removed from this position and subsequently appointed Deputy Head of the Office of the President of Ukraine on the same day.

Social activity
In 2001, he founded the Basketball School Public Organization. From 2001 to 2019, he was the head of the NGO "School of Basketball".

Family
He is married to Halyna Dmytrychenko-Kuleba and has two daughters.

References

1983 births
Living people
Politicians from Kyiv
Governors of Kyiv Oblast
Kyiv National Economic University alumni